Hyphessobrycon compressus, the Mayan tetra, is a species of tetra, belonging to the family Characidae. It is the northernmost species in the genus Hyphessobrycon, as well as its type species.

Description 
The Mayan tetra is a silver fish with clear fins. They express minimal sexual dimorphism, with males being slightly darker than females. The base of the dorsal fin is black in coloration. These fish are known to grow up to 4 to 4.5 centimeters (1.6 to 1.8 inches) in length. It is similar in shape to the black phantom tetra, although it is slightly slimmer in appearance.

Distribution and habitat
The Mayan tetra is known to inhabit the Papaloapan River Basin in southern Mexico, as well as Belize and northern Guatemala.

They live in waters ranging from 23° to 26 °C (73° to 79 °F). As a benthopelagic fish, they resides away from the surface of the water.

Diet
It is presumed that the Mayan tetra is an opportunistic omnivore.

References

Characidae